Elena Maria Petrini (born 11 February 1992) is an Italian professional triathlete, National Junior Aquathlon and National Junior Triathlon Champion, and Junior Aquathlon World Champion of 2010.

Biography
In 2010, Petrini won gold medals at both the National Triathlon and Aquathlon Championships, as well as the Italian Junior Cup. At the Everyman's Sprint Triathlon 2010, Petrini again won gold, and finished the year by winning the gold medal at the Aquathlon World Championships in Budapest.

In 2011, Petrini won the bronze medal at the European Junior Duathlon Championships, and placed 4th at the European Junior Triathlon Championships. She also took part that year in the French Club Championship Series Lyonnaise des Eaux, representing the club SASTRI 37 (Saint-Avertin Sports). At the opening triathlon in Nice (24 April 2011), Petrini placed 21st, finishing second within her club.

Petrini lives in Rome and trains at the Olympic high performance centre Acquacetosa. Her coaches are Alessandro Bottoni and Piergiorgio Conti.

ITU Competitions 
The following list is based upon the official ITU rankings and the ITU Athletes's Profile Page.
Unless indicated otherwise, the following events are triathlons (Olympic distance) and refer to the Elite category.

Notes

External links 
 Italian Triathlon Federation in Italian

Italian female triathletes
1992 births
Living people
People from Spoleto
Sportspeople from the Province of Perugia
European Games competitors for Italy
Triathletes at the 2015 European Games
Triathletes of Fiamme Azzurre
21st-century Italian women